The ornate or painted wood turtle  (Rhinoclemmys pulcherrima) is one of nine turtle species of the genus Rhinoclemmys of the family Geoemydidae. There are four recognized subspecies.

Description

Painted wood turtles can grow to a maximum length of 20 cm. It has a dome-shaped carapace and the plastron has a continuous ventral line. It has red stripes on its body and it has webbed feet.

Distribution
It is found in Mexico (from Sonora southwards) and Central America, as far south as Costa Rica.

Habitat
Painted wood turtles live in rainforests, shallow rivers and bushes. Although they are mostly terrestrial, they can occasionally be found in shallow water.

Diet
The painted wood turtle feeds on fruit, insects, and worms. Their diet should consist of 60% leafy greens, 30% protein, and 20% fruits and vegetables. Along with a varied diet, they require additional calcium to insure healthy shell growth. 
Unlike aquatic turtles, the painted wood turtle doesn't require water in order to swallow its food.

Breeding
Painted wood turtles are oviparous. Females lay 3-5 eggs at a time. Eggs at low temperatures can be dormant early stages, and can sleep for some time at low temperatures, when the temperature returns to normal incubation can proceed.

In captivity
Painted wood turtles can be kept as pets, and it has long been imported into the various parts of Asia, such as Japan, Taiwan and China.  The nominate subspecies is the most common subspecies kept in captivity. They will eat commercial turtle food, and will also eat plant matter.

Subspecies
 Rhinoclemmys pulcherrima incisa - Honduras wood turtle - El Salvador, Guatemala, Nicaragua, Honduras and southern Mexico
 Rhinoclemmys pulcherrima pulcherrima - nominate race - southern Nicaragua, Costa Rica
 Rhinoclemmys pulcherrima manni - Central American wood turtle - Mexico, Guerrero and Oaxaca
 Rhinoclemmys pulcherrima rogerbarbouri - Mexican wood turtle - Mexican endemic subspecies

References

Rhinoclemmys
Turtles of North America
Reptiles of Central America
Reptiles of Mexico
Reptiles of Guatemala
Reptiles described in 1855
Taxa named by John Edward Gray